The Monastery of Loukou is an Orthodox Christian monastery located in eastern Arcadia, Greece.

See also 
 Villa of Herodes Atticus

References

External links

 Holy Metropolis of Mantineia and Kynouria - Holy Monastery of Loukous

Greek Orthodox monasteries in Greece
Christian monasteries established in the 12th century
Commons category link is on Wikidata